Willis Hardy (3 March 1897 – 7 April 1972) was a former Australian rules footballer who played with Carlton in the Victorian Football League (VFL).

Notes

External links 
		
Willis Hardy's profile at Blueseum

1897 births
Australian rules footballers from Victoria (Australia)
Carlton Football Club players
1972 deaths